Halbert Lynn White Jr. (November 19, 1950 – March 31, 2012) was the Chancellor’s Associates Distinguished Professor of Economics at the University of California, San Diego, and a Fellow of the Econometric Society and the American Academy of Arts and Sciences. A native of Kansas City, Missouri, White graduated salutatorian from Southwest High School in 1968. He earned his PhD in Economics at the Massachusetts Institute of Technology in 1976, and spent his first years as an assistant professor in the University of Rochester before moving to UCSD in 1979.

He was well known in the field of econometrics for his 1980 paper on robust standard errors (which is among the most-cited paper in economics since 1970), and for the heteroscedasticity-consistent estimator and the test for heteroskedasticity that are named after him. A 1982 paper by White contributed strongly to the development of quasi-maximum likelihood estimation. He also contributed to numerous other areas such as neural networks and medicine. In 1999, White co-founded an economic consulting firm, Bates White, which is based in Washington, D.C..

Selected publications

References

External links
Faculty profile at the University of California, San Diego's website

1950 births
2012 deaths
Econometricians
Economists from California
University of California, San Diego faculty
Princeton University alumni
MIT School of Humanities, Arts, and Social Sciences alumni
Place of birth missing
Place of death missing
Fellows of the Econometric Society
University of Rochester faculty